Monster house may refer to:

 Monster House (American TV series), a Discovery Channel series that ran from 2003 to 2006.
 Monster House (film), a 2006 animated film
 Monster House (video game), a video game based on the film
 Monster House (Australian TV series), an Australian TV series that debuted in 2008